Robert South (by 1494 – will proved on 11 May 1540), of Salisbury, was an English politician.

South was Mayor of Salisbury in 1528. He was a Member (MP) of the Parliament of England for Salisbury in 1536 and 1539.

References

15th-century births
1540 deaths
People from Salisbury
Mayors of Salisbury
English MPs 1536
English MPs 1539–1540